Esther Jungreis (April 27, 1936 – August 23, 2016, 19 Menachem Av, 5776) was a Jewish, Hungarian-born, American author, and public speaker. She was the founder of the international Hineni organization in the United States. A Holocaust survivor and rebbetzin, she worked to return secular Jews to Orthodox Judaism.

Biography
Jungreis was born in Szeged, Hungary on April 27, 1936, to Avraham and Miriam Jungreis. Her two brothers, Jacob and Binyamin, both became rabbis. Her father was an Orthodox rabbi and operated a shtiebel in the city, in the Neolog (Reform) community.  Avraham Jungreis was deported with other Jews from Szeged in a cattle car bound for Auschwitz. However, a relative who worked for Rudolph Kastner's office arranged for the cattle car to be opened while passing through Budapest and the entire Jungreis family was transferred onto the so-called Kastner train, which after a journey of several weeks and a diversion to the Bergen-Belsen concentration camp in Germany, delivered its 1,670 passengers to Switzerland.

In 1947, the family moved to Brooklyn, New York, where Jungreis reconnected with distant cousin Theodore (Meshulem HaLevi) Jungreis, a rabbi, and they married. The couple settled in North Woodmere, New York, and founded the North Woodmere Jewish Center/Orthodox Congregation Ohr Torah. Together they raised four children.

Jungreis founded the Hineni organization on November 18, 1973, in Madison Square Garden's Felt Forum. The organization aimed to promote Yiddishkeit in the United States. As the leader of this organization, she drew criticism for her outspoken stance against interfaith marriages. She was also critical of secularization, which she viewed as a form of assimilation.

After her husband died in 1996, Jungreis continued with outreach and education. The Yartzeit of her husband was in Shevat, 5756. Along with Paysach Krohn, Jungreis served as a guest speaker at the annual Shavuot retreat hosted by The Gateways Organization.

Jungreis died on August 23, 2016, aged 80, due to complications of pneumonia, and survived by four children — Yisroel Jungreis and Osher Jungreis, both rabbis, and Chaya Sara Gertzulin and Slava Chana Wolff. At the time of her death, she lived in Lawrence.

Outreach work

Hineni

Hineni is an organization founded in May 1973 by Jungreis to encourage Jews to transition to Orthodox Judaism, a part of the movement known as Ba'al Teshuva. Jungreis addressed audiences throughout the 1970s and 80s, including an early program titled "You Are a Jew" at Madison Square Garden on November 18, 1973. She spoke against trends of secularization and assimilation that she considered to be "spiritual genocide".

The word 'Hineni' means 'Here I am' in a spiritual sense, a reference to what Abraham says to God to indicate his readiness in Genesis 22:1 The name chosen by Jungreis contrasts with the Hebrew word "Poe," which means present (as in attendance-taking).

In 1989, the Hineni Heritage Center opened in New York City. The Center houses a multi-media museum and offers classes in Torah studies, Shabbatons (weekends) and High Holy Days services. The Heneni Bill and Jill Roberts Outreach Center in Jerusalem offers guidance and counseling to youths at risk.

Jungreis spoke in locations such as the Hollywood Palladium, the Johannesburg Coliseum, and  Binyanei HaUmah in Jerusalem. She also spoke for the United States Army and Navy and the Israel Defense Forces. In 1998, Hineni opened a soup kitchen and youth center in Jerusalem, offering social and support services for young people at risk, in addition to hosting an annual Passover seder for the city's homeless residents.

Writings
Jungreis wrote four books: Jewish Soul on Fire (William Morrow & Company), The Committed Life: Principles of Good Living from Our Timeless Past (HarperCollins, translated into Hebrew, Russian and Hungarian and in its eighth edition) and The Committed Marriage (HarperCollins). Her last book, published in 2006, was titled Life Is a Test.

For over 40 years, she wrote a column for The Jewish Press using the Torah as the source for solutions to everyday problems.

Awards and recognition
Jungreis was named "Woman of the Year" by Hadassah, Jewish War Veterans, B'nai B'rith, Federation of Jewish Women's Organizations, the Knights of Pythias, and the Christian Amita Society.

U.S. President George W. Bush appointed Jungreis to serve on the honorary delegation that accompanied him to Jerusalem for the celebration of the 60th anniversary of the State of Israel in May 2008.

The Ani Yehudi award was accepted posthumously by her daughter, Slovie Jungreis Wolf, on October 21, 2016.

References

External links
A Tribute To Rebbitzen Esther Jungreis 
Rebbetzin Esther Jungreis: The Big Apple Rebbetzin Enthralls Audiences Worldwide 
Shema Yisrael website in honor of the Rebbetzin
Esther Jungreis Video Gallery
Baruch Dayan Ha'Emmes: Rebbetzin Esther Jungreis A'H; Pioneer In World Of Kiruv
 Congregation Ohr Torah
 Hineni
 Hineni Youth Movement, Australia
 Hineni Tel Aviv, Israel

1936 births
2016 deaths
American Orthodox Jews
American people of Hungarian-Jewish descent
American religious leaders
Holocaust survivors
Hungarian Orthodox Jews
Hungarian emigrants to the United States
National Council of Jewish Women
Orthodox Jewish outreach
People from Szeged
People from Lawrence, Nassau County, New York
Rebbetzins
Deaths from pneumonia in New York (state)
Jews and Judaism in New York City
Jews and Judaism in Jerusalem
People from North Woodmere, New York
American women writers
21st-century American women